Bahar County is in Hamadan province, Iran. The capital of the county is the city of Bahar. At the 2006 census, the county's population was 121,590 in 29,345 households. The following census in 2011 counted 123,869 people in 34,621 households. At the 2016 census, the county's population was 119,082 in 36,844 households.

Administrative divisions

The population history and structural changes of Bahar County's administrative divisions over three consecutive censuses are shown in the following table. The latest census shows two districts, six rural districts, and three cities.

References

 

Counties of Hamadan Province